Educating Yorkshire is the second series of the British documentary television programme Educating broadcast on Channel 4. The eight-episode first series was first broadcast on 5 September 2013. Its format is based on the BAFTA Award-winning 2011 series Educating Essex. It follows the everyday lives of the staff and pupils of Thornhill Community Academy, a secondary school in Dewsbury, West Yorkshire. A Christmas special entitled Educating Yorkshire at Christmas was aired on 19 December 2013.

An episode titled Educating Yorkshire: One Year On was broadcast on 21 August 2014. This episode concentrated on some of the key pupils that the audience met throughout the original series, showing what had been going on in their lives over the past year. The show also included previous year 10 (now year 11) pupils opening their summer 2014 GCSE results.

Episodes

Production
Educating Yorkshire was commissioned by Channel 4 after the success of Educating Essex two years previously. There was interest from about 100 schools in starring in the new series after the production team put a call out to all schools classed as "good" or "outstanding" by Ofsted. David Brindley, producer and director of the series, said "it was undoubtedly easier to find a school this time around". In January 2012, Jonny Mitchell, the headmaster of Thornhill Community Academy in Dewsbury accepted an offer to be a part of a new series based in his school. The school had had a bad reputation and was among the 6% of the worst performing schools in England, with a 2007 Ofsted report describing it as "below average". Mitchell became headmaster in September 2011 and in 2012 it became the most improved school in the Yorkshire area and reached the top 6% of schools nationally. That year, 63% of pupils attained five GCSEs grade A* to C, up 7% since 2011 and only one of the 2012 graduates is not in education, employment or training. This improvement was one of the reasons it was chosen for the series with Mitchell saying "I was proud of what we’d achieved and felt we had a story to tell". Mitchell also said "Dewsbury has suffered quite a lot in the last ten or 15 years with some adverse press. I thought this was an opportunity for us to show the positive side of the town as well".

The show was recorded with 64 cameras rigged up across the school and turned on from 7 am to 5 pm. These were backed up by several handheld cameras and 22 radio microphones. It took six months of preparation before filming began. Parents and pupils were consulted and production staff and psychologists carried out 100 home visits as well as holding parents' evenings and special assemblies. Taking part was not compulsory and 16 pupils out of the school's 747 asked not to appear in the series, with another 30–40 parents requesting that their children feature only in the background.

Before filming began Twofour advised Mitchell to get into contact with Vic Goddard, headmaster of Passmores Academy, the school in which Educating Essex was set. He gave Mitchell advice on handling the attention and stayed in contact throughout the filming process. Mitchell had several concerns about the project such as putting the pupils in a situation where they were going to be laughed at, ridiculed or mocked. Many faculty members also had reservations about taking part, fearing they would be made to look stupid. Deputy head Dale Barrowclough said the turning point was speaking to Goddard.

Two thousand hours of footage was recorded over seven weeks. Mitchell and the staff have said during the first few days of having cameras in their offices and classrooms they were mindful of what they did or said, but after they had got used to them they forget they were there, only occasionally remembering when they moved suddenly. David Brindley, one of the directors, said he was surprised how quickly the pupils forgot they were being filmed "for a day everyone was waving at the cameras, but we were surprised how little people played up after that. I thought we would be confronted by chewing gum on cameras every day, but no". Mitchell also warned pupils who might have been tempted to show off that the production staff would not put them in the final cut of the programme. Brindley said "he told them they had the best chance of getting on TV by being normal". Mitchell also claims there was no deterioration of behaviour across the Academy and based on the behaviour trawl, data, teaching and the pupils' results over the period the behaviour improved while the cameras were there.

Mitchell and Twofour met at least once a day to talk about the things the cameras has been following and ask Mitchell if he had any concerns or comments. He did not have any editorial control but the relationship with Twofour and Channel 4 enabled him to talk openly about things that might concern Mitchell and the staff, and their comments were taken into consideration when the final cut was made.

It was confirmed on 6 November 2013, that a Christmas special of Educating Yorkshire was to be broadcast which followed up on some of the featured pupils and how they are getting on after filming had finished. This later aired on 19 December 2013.

Additionally on 1 August 2014, Channel 4 announced that a new episode titled One Year On would be transmitted on 21 August 2014 that would see some of the pupils collect their GCSE results.

Reception
According to BARB, Educating Yorkshire'''s first episode achieved over 4 million viewers, double the average audience of Educating Essex. 

The series was well received by critics. Benjamin Secher of The Telegraph gave the show four out of five stars. Helen Pidd of The Guardian said "rather than making them look daft, Educating Yorkshire is a great advert for some truly excellent and inspirational teachers". Emily Jupp of The Independent reviewed the first episode saying "although this was not ground-breaking, it was occasionally funny and heart-warming". Huffington Post UK called the teachers "heroes" and the pupils "pretty endearing" while Metro News gave the show four out of five stars.

Terry Payne of Radio Times was more critical of the series, claiming it was exploiting the pupils and was too focused on Georgia in the second episode, saying "the argument is not whether she should be featured, but whether an entire episode should be structured around her misbehaviour", adding that it had turned the documentary into a soap opera.

The final episode received critical acclaim, with social media raising the pupils featured in the episode as well as the inspirational teachers and head of years. The Metro'' stated: "Not a dry eye in the house as Educating Yorkshire draws to a close" in an article for the newspaper's entertainment section.

In January 2014, the show won Most Popular Documentary Series at the National Television Awards.

References

External links
 Educating Yorkshire at Channel 4
 Educating Yorkshire at Twofour
 

2010s British documentary television series
2013 British television seasons
2014 British television seasons
Channel 4 documentaries
Dewsbury
English-language television shows
British high school television series
Television series about educators
Television series about teenagers
Television shows set in Yorkshire
International Emmy Award for Best Non-Scripted Entertainment winners